The Moupin broad-muzzled bat (Submyotodon moupinensis) is a bat in the family Vespertilionidae endemic to southern China.

Description
The fur is long and silky, a yellowish colour on the back, dark brownish-black on the sides and greyish below. The ears are long, with a hollow at the rear edge just below the pointed end. The wing membranes are attached to the back of the toes which are small and delicate. The tail is long and completely inclosed in the large uropatagium, the calcar has a distinct smooth outline.

References

Submyotodon
Endemic fauna of China
Bats of China